Curriculum 2000 was a reform of A Level examinations in the United Kingdom.  It was introduced in September 2000 (with the first AS-Level examinations held in Summer 2001 and A2 examinations the following year). An A Level under this reform consists of four or six units studied over two years. Normally, two or three units are assessed at the end of the first year, and make up a stand-alone Advanced Subsidiary (AS Level) qualification. Another two or three modules are assessed at the end of the second year, which make up the A2 Level.  A2 units do not form a qualification in their own right; the satisfactory completion of the AS and A2 units in the same subject is required to constitute a complete A Level qualification.

Due to the modular structure, units could be taken in January and June of the year, though January exams were abolished after the January 2013 exam session. To begin with each unit could only be retaken once, but this limit was later removed. Some schools choose to conduct all AS and A2 examinations at the end of the first or second years. In the former case, this means students complete the A-level in one year, which is possible for more academically able students. In the latter case, students do not have the opportunity to resit any units and have a more stressful workload at the end of their second year, although by reducing the amount of time taken for exam leave and conducting examinations, more time is available to study the subject in more depth.

Units are assessed by exam papers marked by national organisations and internally assessed coursework. Four organisations set and mark exam papers in England and Wales: Assessment and Qualifications Alliance (AQA), Edexcel, Oxford, Cambridge and RSA Examinations (OCR) and the Welsh Joint Education Committee (WJEC). The Council for the Curriculum, Examinations & Assessment (CCEA) sets them in Northern Ireland. International exams managed by Cambridge International Examinations (CIE) also have A-levels in a variety of subjects.

Response 
The reaction to the new style and structure of qualifications was mixed; whilst many schools and colleges welcomed the increased flexibility and the nature of the modules, the Key Skills courses were increasingly targeted as a failure. Many students were exempt from taking these courses as they had the relevant GCSEs, leaving some classes empty. General apathy towards the courses from UCAS and most universities meant that Key Skills was dropped from some LEAs requirements by the end of 2003.

Some have criticised the modular system for nurturing a 'resit culture' due to the 'generous' resit system, and causing perceived 'grade inflation' where the proportion of candidates achieving higher grades increases, thus eroding the value of those grades. Additionally, while the most academically able candidates benefited from completing some of the subject content early, some felt ill-prepared to take half of their A level exams only a year after taking GCSE exams, not having a second year to improve their grades. Michael Gove, who implemented the A level changes which succeeded Curriculum 2000 has described the modular system as an exam 'treadmill' due to the frequency of examinations.

Succession 
For first teaching from 2015 through 2018 it was succeeded by a new curriculum (first assessment 2017), which reversed most changes brought in by Curriculum 2000 (reverting to linear qualifications where all exams are taken at the end of each course), though kept AS Levels as standalone qualifications which still encompass the first year of the full A level content. Most traditional subjects were reformed in 2015, followed by more in successive years. The changes were completed in 2018.

External links 
 
 
 

Education in the United Kingdom
School qualifications
Educational qualifications in the United Kingdom
Education policy in the United Kingdom
2000 establishments in the United Kingdom